Signal sequence can refer to:
Signal peptide
DNA uptake signal sequence